Erythroxylum vaccinifolium is a flowering plant species in the genus Erythroxylum.

It is used to prepare catuaba, an infusion used as an aphrodisiac in Brazilian herbal medicine. It contains a class of tropane alkaloids called catuabines.

External links

vaccinifolium
Plants described in 1840